The Auckland Rugby Union is a New Zealand provincial rugby union. The union was established in 1883 and was originally responsible for the administration of the sport in most of the former Auckland Province, although its boundaries have since shrunk to include only a portion of the Auckland urban area. The union governs the Auckland representative team, which has won New Zealand's first-tier domestic provincial competition 17 times, more than any other team. Their most recent title was the 2018 Mitre 10 Cup Premiership. The union administers all club rugby within its boundaries, including the Gallaher Shield and other senior club rugby, as well as school rugby. Auckland also acts as a primary feeder to the Blues, who play in the Super Rugby competition.

History
The Auckland Rugby Football Union (ARFU) was officially formed in 1883, when it joined the Canterbury, Wellington and Otago unions in the fledgling New Zealand Rugby Football Union.

Auckland has been the most successful union in New Zealand rugby history, having won a record 16 ITM Cup (and predecessor competition) titles. Auckland also holds the record for the most Ranfurly Shield wins (16), successful defences (148), and longest streak of successful defences (61). All Blacks statistics also reveal the extent of Auckland's influence: of the 1071 players to have worn the national jersey from 1888 to 2008, 133 were born in Auckland, compared to Christchurch (74), Wellington (60) and Dunedin (53).

In 1996, with the advent of professional rugby union, Auckland became the host, and primary feeder, to the Blues, known from 1996–99 as the Auckland Blues.

Golden eras

Auckland went undefeated for six seasons from 1897, with victory over the British and Irish Lions in 1904.  There was an undefeated run in the early 1920s under Sir Vincent Meredith.
The 1960 to 1963 period, known as the Golden Era, was summed up in The Golden Years written by Don Cameron in 1983. Sir Wilson Whineray, who captained Auckland through those years and the All Blacks in 30 tests from 1957 to 1965, describes the period as one of "excitement, drama and fervor that transformed Eden Park into an oasis of magic during the winters of 1960, 1961, 1962 and 1963." The period from 1982 to 2007 is also regarded as a golden period, with Auckland winning more than half (16 out of 26 ) of all NPC titles and five South Pacific Championship titles during the era and winning the team of the year award at the 1992 Halberg Awards.

Ranfurly Shield years
Auckland were the first holders of the Ranfurly Shield in 1902 and have won 153 out of 194 shield matches – the most successful record of any provincial union. Notable periods include from 1905 to 1913, when they defeated 23 successive challenges, 1960 and 1963, when 25 challenges were defeated, 1985 to 1993, when a record 61 were defeated. Auckland most recently held the shield between 2007 and 2008, when 5 challenges were defeated. Players like Andy Haden, Sean Fitzpatrick, John Drake, Olo Brown, Zinzan and Robin Brooke, Gary and Alan Whetton, Michael Jones, Steve McDowall, Grant Fox, Bernie McCahill, Grant Dickson, Mark Carter, Joe Stanley, John Kirwan and Terry Wright were important in Auckland's success in that last period.

In 1993, Auckland defeated the British Lions by 23–18 during their tour to New Zealand.

With six titles in the 1990s and four in the 2000s,  Auckland's domination of the New Zealand rugby landscape continued. The 2007 team was the first since the 1990 side to remain unbeaten in a season and win the Ranfurly Shield and the provincial championship. Players like Kees Meeuws, Keven Mealamu, Ali Williams, Justin Collins, Xavier Rush, Steve Devine, Brad Mika, Ben Atiga, Doug Howlett, Daniel Braid, Brent Ward and Angus Macdonald  contributed to that success.

Auckland' fortunes collapsed when New Zealand Rugby moved to being a professional sport. It was 2018 before an Auckland side once again won the National Provincial Championship.

Honours

National Provincial Championship/Air New Zealand Cup/ITM Cup/Mitre 10 Cup (17):
1982, 1984, 1985, 1987, 1988, 1989, 1990, 1993, 1994, 1995, 1996, 1999, 2002, 2003, 2005, 2007, 2018

South Pacific Championship/Super 6/Super 10 (4):
1987 (shared with Canterbury), 1988, 1989, 1990

Ranfurly Shield
1902–04 (0), 1905–13 (23), 1934–35 (1), 1952 (0), 1959 (2), 1960–63 (25), 1965 (3), 1971 (1), 1972 (0), 1974–76 (10), 1979 (6), 1985–93 (61), 1995–96 (3), 1996–97 (6), 2003–04 (2), 2007–08 (5)

Other representative teams
In addition to the Men's 1st XV, the ARU has a number of other representative teams for both Men and Women. Their women's team, known as the Auckland Storm, are the most successful women's team in New Zealand.

Club rugby
Among the earliest founding clubs in Auckland were Grafton (1874), Ponsonby (1874) and College Rifles (1897), Marist (1908), University (1888), Grammar (1914) and Suburbs (1918).
The premier competition's championship round was renamed the Gallaher Shield in 1922, in memory of Ponsonby, Auckland and New Zealand player Dave Gallaher who captained the 1905 All Blacks, known as The Originals, before retiring after the tour.  He became the sole selector to the Auckland team, leading the side to eight successive Ranfurly Shield wins, before he served on the All Blacks selection committee from 1907 to 1914.  He then joined the army at a relatively late age, and was killed in the Passchendaele offensive in 1917 aged 43.  His Ponsonby side has dominated the Gallaher Shield, winning it 33 times.

Structure
The Auckland Rugby Football Union consists of 20 clubs from the Auckland isthmus. The premier competition runs from March to August and is split into three segments: the Waka Nathan Challenge Cup from March to May (primarily a pre-season tournament), the Alan McEvoy Round-Robin, and the Championship Round (finals series).

 The Waka Nathan Challenge Cup and Pollard Cup

The Waka Nathan Challenge Cup is contested at the beginning of the season in a knockout style competition. Teams play for the cup and a winners prize of $2500. Eight teams compete for the Waka Nathan Cup while the bottom seven teams from the previous year's competition contest the Pollard Cup.

 The Alan McEvoy Round-Robin

The 15 teams entered into the Premier Competition play a 15-week round-robin, played on Saturdays.  The team with the highest competition points at the end of this round will be awarded the Alan McEvoy Memorial Trophy which commemorates Alan McEvoy an Auckland rep and All Black Trialist who drowned tragically at Baylys Beach in the early 1950s. To determine this, the bonus points system is used. Teams will be seeded 1-16 after this round.  The Fred Allen Trophy is also played for during the round-robin phase. It is similar to the Ranfurly Shield, where it is only up for grabs at home games of the trophy holder. It is not contested in the Championship Round.

 Championship Round

In the Championship Round the sixteen teams are split into the top and bottom eight. It is played over three weeks. The top eight compete for the Gallaher Shield, named after former Auckland and All Blacks player Dave Gallaher, while the bottom eight compete for the Portola Trophy.
The first week is a quarter-finals style format where the top seeded team play the bottom seeded team and the second seeded team play the second to last seeded team etc. The four losers from each group of eight go on to play for the Jubilee Trophy (Gallaher Shield Losers) and the President's Cup (Portola Trophy Losers). The next week is semi-finals and the two winners compete for the four trophies mentioned, with the overall champion being the winner of the Gallaher Shield Final.

Affiliated clubs

Gallaher Shield 
The Gallaher Shield is awarded to the winner of the senior premier club rugby competition, for overall club records see Gallaher Shield page.

School competition
The union are one of three organisations (the others being Collegesport and the Secondary Schools Executive Committee) responsible for administering the local secondary school competitions. Notable rugby schools in Auckland include Auckland Grammar School, De La Salle College, Kelston Boys High School, King's College, Mount Albert Grammar School, Sacred Heart College and St Kentigern College. The 1st XV competition is split across three divisions, these being 1A, 1B and 1C. In addition to the 1st XV competition there a number of lower-grade (non-1st XV) and girls competitions.

Supporters

The Auckland Rugby Union Supporters Club (ARUSC) was established in 1976 after a meeting between ARFU administration and a group of supporters. The club's emblem is the "Flying Elephant", which was agreed upon after a competition to find a mascot was found. The winner of the competition was Mr J.E. Hannan. The supporters club is currently located under the North (ASB) Stand at Eden Park.

The ARUSC also operates the Junior Rugby Foundation (JRF). The purposes of the organisation is to provide education, assistant and support for the promotion and development of participation by young people in rugby within the areas governed by the ARFU. Recent JRF bursary recipients include Liaki Moli, Sean Polwart and Tyrone Ngaluafe.

Stadium
Auckland play their home matches at Eden Park, and have done so since 1925. The ground opened in 1900 and also is used for cricket. Eden Park has the largest crowd capacity of any New Zealand sporting venue, with a capacity of 50,000 for rugby matches.

Bunnings NPC

All Blacks
This is a list of players who have represented New Zealand from the Auckland representative rugby union team. Players are listed by the decade they were first selected in and players in bold are current All Blacks.

1880–1899

1900–1919

1920–1939

1940–1959

1960–1979

1980–1989

1990–1999

2000–

References

External links
Official Site
Supporters Club
Auckland Rugby (NZHistory.net.nz)

New Zealand rugby union teams
New Zealand rugby union governing bodies
Sports organizations established in 1883
Rugby union in the Auckland Region